The Thanjavur Nayak Palace Complex, known locally as Aranmanai, today is the official residence of the Bhonsle family that ruled Tanjore from 1674 to 1855.

History 
The Thanjavur Maratha palace was originally constructed by the rulers of Thanjavur Nayak kingdom. After the fall of the Thanjavur Nayak kingdom, it served as the official residence of the Thanjavur Marathas. When most of the Thanjavur Maratha kingdom was annexed by the British Empire in 1799, the Thanjavur Marathas continued to hold sway over the palace and the surrounding fort. The Bhonsle family continued to hold on to the palace even after the last king, Shivaji of Thanjavur.

Constituents 
The palace complex consists of the Sadar Mahal Palace, the queen's courtyard and the Durbar Hall. The Royal Palace Museum contains a splendid collection of Chola bronzes. The Raja Serfoji Memorial Hall and the Royal Palace Museum are situated in the Sadar Mahal Palace. There is also a small bell tower. The Saraswathi Mahal Library is situated with the Thanjavur palace complex. The Chandramouleeswarar temple also is located within the premises.

Gallery

See also
Ambavilas Palace (Mysore Palace) of the Wodeyars
New Palace, Kolhapur of the Bhonsle Chhatrapatis
Laxmi Vilas Palace, Vadodara of the Gaekwads
Jai Vilas Palace, Gwalior of the Scindias
Rajwada, Indore of Holkars
Shaniwar Wada, Pune of the Peshwas

Citations

References

Buildings and structures of the Maratha Empire
Palaces in Tamil Nadu
Tourist attractions in Thanjavur
Thanjavur Maratha kingdom
Museums in Tamil Nadu
Royal residences in India